The La Venta River is a river of Chiapas state in southern Mexico. It is a tributary of the Grijalva River.

The La Venta River runs through a canyon 84 km in length, with limestone canyon walls soaring up to 500 meters above the river. The porous limestone has eroded into karst landscape, with sinkholes, fissures, dolines and caverns. These include the cavern called the Arch of Time (El Arco del Tiempo), which opens directly onto the river.

The La Venta canyon is within the Selva El Ocote Biosphere Reserve.

See also
List of rivers of Mexico

References

The Prentice Hall American World Atlas, 1984.
Rand McNally, The New International Atlas, 1993.

Rivers of Chiapas
Grijalva River
World Heritage Tentative List for Mexico